Themira is a genus of flies in the family Sepsidae.

Species
T. annulipes (Meigen, 1826)
T. arctica Becker in Becker, 1915
T. biloba Andersson, 1975
T. germanica Duda, 1926
T. gracilis (Zetterstedt, 1847)
T. leachi (Meigen, 1826)
T. lucida (Staeger in Schiødte, 1844)
T. malformans Melander & Spuler, 1917
T. minor (Haliday, 1833)
T. nigricornis (Meigen, 1826)
T. paludosa Elberg, 1963
T. pusilla (Zetterstedt, 1847)
T. putris (Linnaeus, 1758)
T. ringdahli Pont, 2002
T. sipmlicipes (Duda, 1926)
T. superba (Haliday, 1833)

See also
List of sepsid fly species recorded in Europe

References

Sepsidae
Diptera of Europe
Taxa named by Jean-Baptiste Robineau-Desvoidy
Brachycera genera